The 2018–19 Goa Professional League is the 21st season of the Goa Professional League, the top football league in the Indian state of Goa, since its establishment 1996. The league kicked on 10 October 2018 and will conclude in March 2019.  

The league matches are being played at the Duler Stadium Poriat Football Ground, Navelim Football Ground, Corps of Signal Football Ground.

Teams

Standings

Top scorers

References

External links 
Goa Football Association facebook
Goa Professional League

Goa Professional League seasons
2018–19 in Indian football leagues